Nanchang (101) is a Type 055 destroyer of the People's Liberation Army Navy. She was commissioned on 12 January 2020.

Development and design 
The People's Liberation Army Navy was interested in a large destroyer from as early as the late-1960s. A development program, code-named "055", initiated in 1976 was cancelled in 1983 after encountering insurmountable technical obstacles from industrial underdevelopment; for example, the required gas turbine power plants could neither be produced domestically, nor imported at acceptable prices. In April 2014, an image emerged of a full-scale mock-up of the Type 055 superstructure - with enclosed integrated mast for radar and other electronics at the Chinese naval electronic testing range in Wuhan.

The Type 055 is expected to undertake expeditionary missions and form the primary escort for Chinese aircraft carriers. The United States classifies these ships as cruisers.

Construction and career 
Nanchang is the lead ship of the class and laid down in December 2014 at the Jiangnan Shipyard in Shanghai. She made her first public appearance preceding commissioning was during the PLAN's 70th anniversary parade on 23 April 2019. When launched, Nanchang was among the largest post-Second World War warships launched in East Asia. She was commissioned on 12 January 2020.

On 5 April 2021, Nanchang became the first destroyer of her class take part in an aircraft carrier group in which was the aircraft carrier Liaoning, Chengdu, Taiyuan, Huanggang and Hulunhu while they were spotted between Okinawa and Miyako Island.

On 22 May 2022, Nanchang conducted drills in the East China Sea as a part of the Liaoning Carrier Group; and they were sighted near Miyako Island by the JMSDF.

Gallery

References 

2017 ships
Ships built in China
Type 055 destroyers